Odakyu 5000 series may refer to:
Odakyu 5000 series (1969)
Odakyu 5000 series (2019)